The Geological Society of Australia (GSA) was established as a non-profit organisation in 1952 to promote, advance and support earth sciences in Australia. The founding Chairperson was Edwin Sherbon Hills.

William Rowan Browne was a founder of the society and was president 1955–56.

Publications
Australian Journal of Earth Sciences (AJES) – official journal of the GSA, eight issues per year
The Australian Geologist (TAG) – quarterly magazine that includes technical and special features, society news, conference details, regular reports, book reviews and news from Australia's geoscience sector
Alcheringa – quarterly publication of the Australasian Association of Palaeontologists Specialist Group (published through Taylor & Francis)
Geoz – the GSA's electronic bulletin

References

External links
Official website

Learned societies of Australia
Organizations established in 1952
Scientific organisations based in Australia
Australia
1952 establishments in Australia